In business, a unicorn is a privately held startup company valued at over US$1 billion. The term was first published in 2013, coined by venture capitalist Aileen Lee, choosing the mythical animal to represent the statistical rarity of such successful ventures. 

CB Insights identified 1,170 unicorns worldwide . Unicorns with over $10 billion in valuation have been designated as "decacorn" companies. For private companies valued over $100 billion, the terms "centicorn" and "hectocorn" have been used.  SpaceX is in the forefront to reach the elusive "superunicorn" status, to reach over $1 trillion valuation while remaining as a private company.

History  
Aileen Lee originated the term "unicorn" in a 2013 TechCrunch article, "Welcome To The Unicorn Club: Learning from Billion-Dollar Startups". At the time, 39 companies were identified as unicorns. In a different study done by Harvard Business Review, it was determined that startups founded between 2012 and 2015 were growing in valuation twice as fast as companies from startups founded between 2000 and 2013.

In 2018, 16 U.S. companies became unicorns, resulting in 119 private companies worldwide valued at $1 billion or more.

Globally, according to CB Insights, there were more than 803 unicorns , with ByteDance, SpaceX and Stripe among the largest, and 30 decacorns, including SpaceX, Getir, Goto, J&T Express, Stripe, and Klarna.

The surge of unicorns was reported as "meteoric" for 2021, with $71 billion invested in 340 new companies, a banner year for startups and for the US venture capital industry; the unprecedented number of companies valued at more than $1 billion during 2021 exceeded the sum total of the five previous year. Six months later, in June 2022, 1,170, total unicorns were reported.Over 90 unicorns have been created by Israelis.

Reasons for rapid growth of unicorns

Fast-growing strategy 
During the mid-2000s, investors and venture capital firms were adopting the first-mover advantage and get big fast (GBF) strategies for startups, also known by the neologism, "blitzscaling". GBF is a strategy where a startup tries to expand at a high rate through large funding rounds and price cutting to gain an advantage on market share and push away rival competitors as fast as possible. The rapid returns through this strategy seem to be attractive to all parties involved, despite the cautionary note of the dot-com bubble of 2000, as well as a lack of long-term sustainability in value creation of emerging companies of the Internet age.

Company buyouts 
Many unicorns were created through buyouts from large public companies. In a low-interest-rate and slow-growth environment, many companies like Apple, Meta, and Google focus on acquisitions instead of focusing on capital expenditures and development of internal investment projects. Some large companies would rather bolster their businesses through buying out established technology and business models rather than creating it themselves.

Increase of private capital available 
The average age of a technology company before it goes public is 11 years, as opposed to an average life of four years back in 1999. This new dynamic stems from the increased amount of private capital available to unicorns and the passing of the U.S.'s Jumpstart Our Business Startups (JOBS) Act in 2012, which increased by a factor of four the number of shareholders a company can have before it has to disclose its financials publicly. The amount of private capital invested in software companies has increased three-fold from 2013 to 2015.

Prevent IPO 
Through many funding rounds, companies do not need to go through an initial public offering (IPO) to obtain a capital or a higher valuation; they can just go back to their investors for more capital. IPOs also run the risk of devaluation of a company if the public market thinks a company is worth less than its investors. A few recent examples of this situation were Square, best known for its mobile payments and financial services business, and Trivago, a popular German hotel search engine, both of which were priced below their initial offer prices by the market. This was because of the severe over-valuation of both companies in the private market by investors and venture capital firms. The market did not agree with both companies' valuations, and therefore, dropped the price of each stock from their initial IPO range.

Investors and startups may choose to avoid an IPO due to increased regulations. Regulations like the Sarbanes–Oxley Act have implemented more stringent regulations following several bankruptcy cases in the U.S. market that many of these companies want to avoid.

Technological advances 
Startups have capitalized on the rapid growth of new technology to obtain unicorn status. With the advent of social media and access to millions utilizing this technology to gain massive economies of scale, startups have the ability to expand their business faster than ever. New innovations in technology including mobile smartphones, P2P platforms, and cloud computing with the combination of social media applications has aided in the growth of unicorns.

Valuation 
The valuations that designate start-up companies as unicorns and decacorns differ more established companies. A valuation for an established company stems from past years' performances, while a start-up company's valuation is derived from its growth opportunities and its expected development in the long-term for its potential market. Valuations for unicorns usually result from funding rounds of large venture capital firms investing in a start-up company. Another significant final valuation of start-ups is when a much larger company buys out a company, giving it that valuation; some examples are Unilever buying Dollar Shave Club and Facebook buying Instagram for $1 billion each, effectively turning Dollar Shave Club and Instagram into unicorns.

Bill Gurley, a partner at venture capital firm Benchmark, predicted in March 2015 and earlier that the rapid increase in the number of unicorns may "have moved into a world that is both speculative and unsustainable", that will leave in its wake what he terms "dead unicorns". Also he said that the main reason of unicorns' valuation is the "excessive amount of money" available for them. Similarly, in 2015 William Danoff, who manages the Fidelity Contrafund, said unicorns might be "going to lose a bit of luster" due to their more frequent occurrence and several cases of their stock price being devalued. Research by Stanford professors published in 2018 suggests that unicorns are overvalued by an average of 48%.

Valuation of high-growth companies 
For high-growth companies looking for the highest valuations possible, it comes down to potential and opportunity. When investors of high-growth companies are deciding on whether they should invest in a company or not, they look for signs of a home run to make exponential returns on their investment along with the right personality that fits the company. To give such high valuations in funding rounds, venture capital firms have to believe in the vision of both the entrepreneur and the company as a whole. They have to believe the company can evolve from its unstable, uncertain present standing into a company that can generate and sustain moderate growth in the future.

Market sizing 
To judge the potential future growth of a company, there needs to be an in-depth analysis of the target market. When a company or investor determines its market size, there are a few steps they need to consider to figure out how large the market really is:
 Defining the sub-segment of the market (no company can target 100% market share, also known as monopolization)
 Top-Down market sizing
 Bottom-Up analysis
 Competitor analysis
After the market is reasonably estimated, a financial forecast can be made based on the size of the market and how much a company thinks it can grow in a certain time period.

Estimation of finances 
To properly judge the valuation of a company after the revenue forecast is completed, a forecast of the operating margin, analysis of needed capital investments, and return on invested capital needs to be completed to judge the growth and potential return to investors of a company. Assumptions of where a company can grow to needs to be realistic, especially when trying to get venture capital firms to give the valuation a company wants. Venture capitalists know the payout on their investment will not be realized for another five to ten years, and they want to make sure from the start that financial forecasts are realistic.

Valuation methods 
With the financial forecasts set, investors need to know what the company should be valued in the present day. This is where more established valuation methods become more relevant.

This includes the three most common valuation methods:
 Discounted cash flow analysis
 Market comparable method
 Comparable transactions
Investors can derive a final valuation from these methods and the amount of capital they offer for a percentage of equity within a company becomes the final valuation for a startup. Competitor financials and past transactions also play an important part when providing a basis for valuing a startup and finding a correct valuation for these companies.

Trends

Sharing economy 
The sharing economy, also known as "collaborative consumption" or "on-demand economy", is based on the concept of sharing personal resources. This trend of sharing resources has made three of the top five largest unicorns (Uber, DiDi, and Airbnb) become the most valuable startups in the world. The economic trends of the 2010s powered consumers to learn to be more conservative with spending and the sharing economy reflected this.

E-commerce 
E-commerce and the innovation of the online marketplace have been slowly taking over the needs for physical locations of store brands. A prime example of this is the decline of malls within the United States, the sales of which declined from $87.46 billion in 2005 to $60.65 billion in 2015. The emergence of e-commerce companies like Amazon and Alibaba (both unicorns before they went public) has decreased the need for physical locations to buy consumer goods. Many large corporations have seen this trend for a while and have tried to adapt to the e-commerce trend. Walmart in 2016 bought Jet.com, an American e-commerce company, for $3.3 billion to try to adapt to consumer preferences.

Innovative business model 
In support of the sharing economy, unicorns and successful startups have built an operating model defined as "network orchestrators". In this business model, there is a network of peers creating value through interaction and sharing. Network orchestrators may sell products/services, collaborate, share reviews, and build relations through their businesses. Examples of network orchestrators include all sharing economy companies (i.e. Uber, Airbnb), companies that let consumers share information (i.e. TripAdvisor, Yelp), and peer-to-peer or business-to-person selling platforms (i.e. Amazon, Alibaba).

Criticism 
The categorization of startups as unicorns has not been without criticism. For example, an economic policy focus on enabling more unicorns, as the European Union is striving to do, threatens to lose sight of other societally desirable forms of entrepreneurship. Similarly, the definition of unicorns is characterized as only superficially precise. Additionally, a focus on unicorns runs the risk of causing increased unethical behavior among entrepreneurs (such as in the Theranos case).

2022 unicorn dismount 

Many "unicorns," or start-up companies valued at more than $1 billion, saw their valuations fall in 2022. The economic slowdown caused by the COVID-19 pandemic, increased market volatility, stricter regulatory scrutiny & underperforming businesses are all factors contributing to this decline. As a result, many unicorns saw their valuations fall or were acquired by larger companies at lower prices than expected.

The pandemic had a significant impact on the global economy and many startups were negatively affected by the resulting slowdown in consumer spending and decreased investment. The increased volatility in financial markets made it more difficult for startups to raise capital and also caused a decrease in their valuation. With the rise of unicorns, regulators began to pay more attention to these companies, resulting in increased regulatory scrutiny and oversight. As a result, some unicorns faced legal and financial challenges, lowering their valuation. Some unicorns failed to meet expectations and did not live up to their hype, causing their valuation to fall. This was frequently the result of factors such as intense competition, an inability to scale quickly enough or mismanagement. The hype surrounding unicorns led to an influx of investment in the startup market. However, as investors started to become more cautious the investment market cooled & funding for startups became harder to come by. In some cases, unicorns were overvalued and the market corrected their prices to better reflect their actual value.

See also
 List of unicorn startup companies
 List of venture capital firms
 Unicorn bubble
 Valuation (finance)
 Venture capital financing
 First-mover advantage
 Michael Porter (economist)
 Reid Hoffman (economist)

References

External links
 

2010s neologisms
Valuation (finance)